The 2007 Christy Ring Cup began on Saturday, 9 June 2007.  The Christy Ring Cup is an annual hurling competition organised by the Gaelic Athletic Association since 2005 for middle-ranking hurling teams in Ireland. The 2007 competition was won by Westmeath GAA.

Format
10 counties are contesting the 2007 competition for the Christy Ring Cup — the prize for the winners of Tier Two of the Guinness All-Ireland Hurling Championship. The 2007 competition involves the current middle rank of hurling counties: 
 Leinster: Carlow, Kildare, Meath, Westmeath and Wicklow
 Ulster: Derry and Down
 Connacht: Mayo 
 Munster: Kerry
 Britain: London

These 10 counties are divided into two groups of five and play in a round-robin format, guaranteeing at least four games each. The eventual group winners and runners-up will qualify for the semi-finals of the Christy Ring Cup. Unlike previous years the winners of this year Christy Ring Cup were not promoted to Tier One of the Hurling Championship to contest the Liam MacCarthy Cup the following year. This was decided by the GAA Congress in October 2006.

The last team in each group was involved in a relegation play-off with the eventual loser being relegated to the Nicky Rackard Cup.

Results

Group 2A

Group 2B

Semi-finals

Final

Top scorers

Single game

References

Christy Ring Cup
Christy Ring Cup